Ruquiya Saeed Hashmi is a Pakistani politician who was a Member of the Provincial Assembly of Balochistan, from May 2013 to May 2018.
Ms.Hashmi is married to Senator Saeed Hashmi.

Education
Hashmi holds the degree of the Bachelor of Medicine and Bachelor of Surgery.

Political career

She was elected to the Provincial Assembly of Balochistan as a candidate of Pakistan Muslim League (Q) on a reserved seat for women in 2013 Pakistani general election.

References

Living people
Balochistan MPAs 2013–2018
Women members of the Provincial Assembly of Balochistan
Pakistan Muslim League (Q) politicians
Year of birth missing (living people)
21st-century Pakistani women politicians